Wissenaire is the annual techno-management festival of Indian Institute of Technology Bhubaneswar held in the Arugul, permanent campus of IIT Bhubaneswar. It is one of the most awaited technical festival of East India. It is a three-day-long event usually held during the third week of January every year. The word Wissenaire is derived from the German word ‘Wissen’ meaning knowledge and ‘aire’ meaning free. Thus it is justified by its tagline knowledge runs free. Wissenaire encompasses various sectors of technology, science and management. These include quizzing, coding, designing, robotics, planning and testing the creativity and innovative spirit of the young technical minds.

History
Novus is regarded as the first technical fest by IIT Bhubaneswar. But it remained an intra-college event. Later in 2011, technical enthusiasts of IIT Bhubaneswar conducted the maiden edition of its techfest and named it Wissenaire. The maiden edition received an enormous response from across the country. Wissenaire had an overwhelming participation from various parts of the country like Kerala, Tamil Nadu, West Bengal, Uttar Pradesh and Andhra Pradesh as well as home state Orissa. The fest is also associated with Solid works, Microsoft, Dell and IBM.

Events
Wissenaire has collection of events of both technical and management domains. The events are clubbed into following groups:

Yanthrix

Yanthrix represents the robotics events of the fest. The events are noted for promotion of spirit of technology among the techies. The events under Yanthrix are
 Kick Off: Robo football
 Robowars: Event where robots battle to the death
 Rescue Bot: Event where robots climb
 Pixelomania 
 Navigator

Ingenium

Ingenium encompasses all the events under management. The event tests the innovative and managerial skills of the students. The events under Ingenium are
 Plan De Negocious: Business plan competition
 Rostrum: Youth Parliament
 Finanza: Event to think of a suitable solution to overcome a particular economic problem
 Pitched: Ad making competition

Qwissenaire

Qwissenaire is the set of quiz events with technical and managerial background.
 Biz Quiz: Business related questions
 Tech Quiz: Emphasis of technical related questions

Grand Arcanum

Grand Arcanum includes the design and thinking competitions of Wissenaire.
 Electronix: Circuit designing event
 Green Venture: Event to construct an ecofriendly design or prototype
 Kreativ: Video making competition
 Replica: Designing a crane which can lift weight using principles of hydraulics
 Smart Frame: Construction of bridge using ice cream sticks which can sustain max central load
 Trebuchet: Catapult design event
 Contrivance: Car race event (car should not have any power source)

Colloquia

Colloquia is a paper presentation competition of various fields of science that includes
 Civil Engineering
 Economics
 Electrical Engineering
 Mechanical Engineering
 Metallurgy
 Computer science Engineering

I-Box

I-Box is a collection of online events.
 LanWar
 Sherlock: Detective story writing

Matricks

Matricks is a platform to develop one's creativity with our brain storming problem statements.
 Codec: C programming event
 caded: CAD designing 
 Richtig

Eclectic

 Break The Law
 Smash The Bug
 Maths Olympiad:  Cracking mathematical questions

Workshops
Wissenaire brings out the live experience of latest technology and its practical applications through its workshops. Attracting many technical enthusiasts, the fest included workshops by international companies such as Microsoft, Dell, Mechahawks, Archipidia, Ablabs solutions, ETRIX technologies, BATOI, Robo Edutech India, IBM and National Instruments.

Knights Incite
Knights Incite is the guest lecture series of Wissenaire. Stalwarts of different sectors of technology, academia, management and research deliver the prestigious Knight’s Incite lecture about their area of expertise. Mission of Knight’s Incite is to provide a chance for young mind to interact with the elites of the technological and corporate world.

Previous Editions

2013
In 2013,Wissenaire has witnessed visits by luminaries like social activist Kiran Bedi, Dutch Magician and Mentalist Arvind Jayashankar and SK Roongta, former SAIL chairman. Wissenaire also brought the first ever 3D laser show to Bhubaneswar which was held in Janta Maidan. Wissenaire has also witnessed workshops by international software giants like Microsoft, Dell and IBM. DRDO has been a regular participant in Wissenaire displaying their might.

2015

In 2015,Wissenaire has witnessed visits by renowned personalities like Pakistani pop singer Falak Shabir, the Great Indian Manager of Dabbawala Dr. Pawan Agrawal,  mentalist from Israel Roy Zaltsman,  the author of the best selling book 'I too had a love story' Ravinder Singh,Varun Agrawal Indian first-generation entrepreneur, guinness world record holder for largest human beat box Vineeth Vincent. Wissenaire also brought semifinalists of India's Got Talent Season 5 Shadow Art, 3D Mapping as part of Magna Vista.

References

External links
 Wissenaire Official Website

Indian Institutes of Technology festivals
Festivals established in 2010
2010 establishments in Orissa